Diocese of Nagpur may refer to:
Roman Catholic Archdiocese of Nagpur
Diocese of Nagpur (Church of North India)